Colonel James Hamilton Stanhope (1788–1825), was a British Army officer who fought in the Peninsular War and at the Battle of Waterloo. He was a Member of Parliament for Buckingham, 1817–1818, Fowey, 1818–1819, and Dartmouth, 1822–1825.

Biography
He was the third and youngest son of Charles Stanhope, 3rd Earl Stanhope.

Stanhope was joined in the British Army at the age of 15, contrary to his father's wishes, but by the advice and influence of William Pitt the Younger; who was 3rd Earl's second cousin, by the marriage of his grandfather, the 1st Earl, to Lucy, sister of Robert Pitt of Boconnock (the Minister's grandfather).  He entered the British Army as Ensign in the 1st Foot Guards, 26 December 1805; was promoted Lieutenant and Captain, 14 January 1808; brevet Major, 21 June 1813; and Captain and Lieutenant-Colonel in the 1st Foot Guards, 25 July 1814.

Stanhope served in Spain, Portugal, Flanders and France. He served as on the staff of General Sir John Moore as an aide-de-camp in 1809. He acted as extra aid-de-camp to Lord Lynedock (1810–1814). In 1812 was appointed a Deputy Assistant Quarter Master General, and in 1813 as Assistant Quarter Master General in the Peninsula.

During the storming of San Sebastian in late August early September 1813, Stanhope received a grape-shot wound in the spine. The opinion of the surgeons by whom he was attended, was that the ball could not, without imminent risk of fatal consequences, be extracted, so it remained lodged in place and caused him immense suffering for the rest of his life.  He remained in the army and in 1815 served as an assistant adjacent to Duke of Wellington during the Waterloo Campaign and took part in the Battle of Waterloo and the subsequent the march upon Paris. From 1815 until he died he was aid-de-camp to Prince Frederick.

Stanhope was first elected to parliament in 1817; he was returned for Fowey at the general election in 1818, but was not re-chosen in 1820. In that year he was, by the will of Sir Joseph Banks, appointed one of his four executors.  Stanhope re-entered the House of Commons in early in 1822 as M.P. for Dartmouth, and continued so until his death.

Marriage and death
On 9 July 1820, Stanhope married Frederica-Louisa, eldest daughter of David William, 3rd Earl Mansfield. She gave birth to one son, James Stanhope, but died on 14 January 1823.

Greatly afflicted at the death of his wife Stanhope gave up his establishment in South Audley Street in London and moved into Kenwood House, the seat of his father-in-law. In 1825 Stanhope was still very depressed over the loss of his wife and continued to suffer physical discomfort from the wound he had received in Spain twelve years earlier. He had appeared very abstracted, and was in the habit of sitting a long time, as if in a state of stupor, and then he would suddenly start up, as if from sleep or upon an alarm. A few days before his death on 5 March, he had complained very much that be could get no sleep, in consequence of the pain he endured. Afflicted in his melancholy manner, whilst walking in the park at some distance from the house, he entered a shed, formed to shelter the cattle, and suspended himself with his braces from a beam. His body was not discovered till some hours after, when, the household being alarmed, a general search was in progress. A Coroner's jury gave a verdict of "temporary insanity".

Bibliography

Notes

References
 

Attribution

Further reading

 

1788 births
1825 deaths
British politicians who committed suicide
Members of the Parliament of the United Kingdom for Fowey
Members of the Parliament of the United Kingdom for Dartmouth
UK MPs 1812–1818
UK MPs 1818–1820
UK MPs 1820–1826
James Hamilton
Younger sons of earls
Suicides by hanging in England
Suicides in England